Joe Timmons (16 August 1933 – 30 January 2009) was an Irish Gaelic footballer who played as a left corner-back at senior level for the Dublin county team.

Timmons began his inter-county career as a member of the senior Wicklow team in the early 'fifties. He later declared for Dublin and had much success going forward into the early 'sixties. During that time he won one All-Ireland medal, two Leinster medals and one National Football League medal.

At club level Timmons began his career with Annacurra in Wicklow before later playing for St Mary's in Dublin.

His brother, John Timmons, was also an All-Ireland medalist with Dublin.

References

1933 births
2009 deaths
Annacurra Gaelic footballers
Dublin inter-county Gaelic footballers
Gaelic football backs
St Mary's (Dublin) Gaelic footballers
Wicklow inter-county Gaelic footballers
Winners of one All-Ireland medal (Gaelic football)